Tyrannosaurus Tex is a cancelled first-person shooter video game for the Nintendo Game Boy Color portable console developed by Slitherine Software and planned to be released in March 2000. The game generated high expectations, as it would have been the only first-person shooter released for the Game Boy Color.

In January 2013, a 30 minutes gameplay footage video was released to the Internet, after the prototype cartridge was sold at auction.

On March 8, 2016, Piko Interactive announced that they had acquired the rights to this game, and it was later released officially in May 2018. They also planning to port this game to PC and "other" platforms.

References

Cancelled Game Boy Color games
First-person shooters
Game Boy Color games
Piko Interactive games
Sprite-based first-person shooters
Video games with 2.5D graphics